The MV Tai Ching 21 was a Taiwanese fishing vessel which was found empty and gutted by fire on 9 November 2008 near Kiribati. The abandoned 50-ton ship had suffered a fire several days previously, and its lifeboat and three life rafts were missing. No mayday call was received. The date of the last radio transmission from the vessel was 28 October 2008.

References

2000s missing person cases
Fishing vessels
Ghost ships
Maritime incidents in 2008
Maritime incidents in Kiribati
Ships of Taiwan
Mass disappearances
People lost at sea